Eordaia is a municipality in the Kozani regional unit, Greece. The seat of the municipality is the town Ptolemaida. The municipality has an area of 708.807 km2. The population was 45,592 in 2011.

Municipality
The municipality Eordaia was formed at the 2011 local government reform by the merger of the following 5 former municipalities, that became municipal units:
Agia Paraskevi
Mouriki
Ptolemaida
Vermio
Vlasti

Province
The province of Eordaia was one of the provinces of the Kozani Prefecture. Its territory corresponded with that of the current municipality Eordaia, and a few villages of the municipality Kozani. It was abolished in 2006.

History

The history of Eordaia can be found stretching long before 2000 BCE when the first Greeks known as the Mycenean Greeks began to inhabit this area. Remnants of copper mines exploited from 2700 up until 1200 BCE indicate strongly that the Greeks inhabited Eordaia for many years. Iron mines have also been exploited in the region.

Recent discoveries
Within a 50-year period, paleontologists and archaeologists have made many discoveries due to the industrial development of the Eordaian countryside. In particular, the skeletal fossils of a prehistoric mammoth, a prehistoric elephant, and Stone Age tools have all been found within the province of Eordaia. These finds add to knowledge on the variety of animal species and human artifacts in this particular region of western Macedonia. In addition, two ancient Macedonian tombs have been excavated within Eordaia. The first was located in a rural area of the village of Spilia, while the second was located in the village of Pyrgoi.

External links
Ειδήσεις για την ΕΟΡΔΑΙΑ (www.eordaia.com)

References

Municipalities of Western Macedonia
Provinces of Greece
Populated places in Kozani (regional unit)